Britta Siegers (born 4 July 1966) is a retired German wheelchair tennis player and Paralympic swimmer who competed in international level events. She was the first German disabled athlete to compete in two different sports at the Paralympics: she was a swimmer from 1984 to 1992 and returned twelve years later as a wheelchair tennis player at the 2004 Summer Paralympics.

Swimming career
Siegers' first sport was swimming when she started in 1969 after she lost both of her legs in a train accident aged two years old. She swam competitively in 1984 at the Summer Paralympics and won her first medals there. Her most successful Paralympic Games was in 1992 where she won five gold medals, two silvers and one bronze medal, she narrowly missed winning her consecutive freestyle titles after being beaten by Priya Cooper in both the 50m and 100m freestyle S8.

Tennis career
Siegers began playing wheelchair tennis in the early 1994 after her retirement to swimming in 1992. She won seven singles titles and eleven doubles titles and her highest ranking was World No. 8 in July 2003, she competed at her fourth and last Summer Paralympics Games in Athens in 2004 where she reached the quarterfinals in the women's singles.

References

External links
 
 

1966 births
Living people
Sportspeople from Leverkusen
Paralympic swimmers of Germany
Paralympic wheelchair tennis players of Germany
Swimmers at the 1984 Summer Paralympics
Swimmers at the 1988 Summer Paralympics
Swimmers at the 1992 Summer Paralympics
Wheelchair tennis players at the 2004 Summer Paralympics
Medalists at the 1984 Summer Paralympics
Medalists at the 1988 Summer Paralympics
Medalists at the 1992 Summer Paralympics
German female tennis players
German female freestyle swimmers
German female backstroke swimmers
German female breaststroke swimmers
German female butterfly swimmers
German female medley swimmers
S8-classified Paralympic swimmers